Maps of Non-Existent Places is the debut full-length album by progressive rock band Thank You Scientist. This is the only album to feature Greg Colacino on bass and Russ Lynch on violin, viola and mandolin.

Track listing

Personnel 
Credits adapted from the CD booklet.

Thank You Scientist
 Salvatore Marrano – vocals
 Tom Monda – guitar, fretless guitar, acoustic guitars, cello, shamisen, vocals
 Russ Lynch – violin, viola, mandolin, vocals
 Andrew Digrius – trumpet, flugelhorn, trombone, vocals
 Ellis Jasenovic – tenor and soprano saxophone
 Greg Colacino – bass
 Odin Alvarez – drums, percussion

Additional musicians
 David Bodie – percussion
 Mark Radice – vocals

Production
 Jesse Cannon – recording, engineering, mixing
 Mike Oettinger – recording, engineering
 Ron "Bumblefoot" Thal – extra ears
 Alan Douches – mastering
 Jeff Fariello – additional tracking on "Prelude"

Charts

References 

2012 debut albums
Thank You Scientist albums